Safe from Harm is the second album by Dusted.

Safe From Harm may also refer to:

 "Safe from Harm" (song), the 1990 EP from Massive Attack
 Safe from Harm (Winans), the 2005 single from BeBe Winans (in a duet with Ron Winans)